Gogolevsky Boulevard is a boulevard near the Arbat District, Moscow, Russia, named after the writer Nikolai Gogol. It was named Prechistensky Boulevard until 1924, after the nearby street Prechistenka.

The boulevard begins next to the Cathedral of Christ the Saviour, and is the beginning of the Boulevard Ring. The boulevard runs north-east and ends at the Arbat Square, from where it continues as Nikitsky Boulevard.

Boulevards in Moscow
Cultural heritage monuments of regional significance in Moscow